Brookdale is a rural locality in the central east part of the Riverina.  It is about 8 kilometres, by road, north-west of Bullenbung and 34 kilometres south-east of Galore.

Notes and references

Towns in the Riverina
Towns in New South Wales